Josef Marx (20 November 1934 – 24 August 2008) was a German international footballer who played as a midfielder for SV Sodingen and Karlsruher SC.

References

External links
 Profile at worldfootball.net
 

1934 births
2008 deaths
German footballers
Germany international footballers
Karlsruher SC players
Bundesliga players
Association football midfielders
People from Geseke
Sportspeople from Arnsberg (region)
Footballers from North Rhine-Westphalia
West German footballers
People from the Province of Westphalia